High Five Drive is a melodic hardcore/skate punk band from Winnipeg, Manitoba, Canada, known for their high-energy live performances.

History

Since forming in 2001, they have released one EP and three full-length albums. They have toured across Canada, appearing with such bands as Comeback Kid, A Wilhelm Scream, the Cancer Bats and Die Mannequin. In May 2009 they embarked on their third European tour, playing with The Living Daylights and Rentokill.

Their latest album, FullBlast, was produced and engineered by John Peters, known for working with Comeback Kid and A Textbook Tragedy. This album was released in Europe on various labels including Bad Mood Records, No Reason Records and Fond of Life Records. This album was released independently in Canada and on Fast Life Records in Japan.

Band members

Current members

 Greg Rekus (Guitar, Vocals)
 Steve Jowsey (Drums, Vocals)
 Steve Nelson (Bass guitar)
 Marty Lafreniere (Guitar, Vocals)

Former members

 Dal Reimer (Guitar, Vocals)
 Brent Smith (Bass guitar)
 Nick Kolisnyk (Drums)

Discography

...Something Better (EP) (2002)

 A Relative Matter
 Reflection
 Lead Boots
 Discouragement
 Potential

Service Engine Soon (2004)

 Colic
 A Relative Matter
 Straight and Narrow Minded
 Fallen
 Is This My Life?
 September
 No Buddah, No Dharma
 As This Body Betrays Me
 This is My Rifle
 Abandon This Compromise

From the Ground Up (2007)

 Separation
 End In Grey
 Left Behind
 The Storm Before Calm
 Hope For The Best
 Looking Past It All
 Thought Crime Agenda
 Survivor
 Remember Everything
 Never Around

FullBlast (2009)

 Vengeance Theme
 Eight Hour Drives
 Foreign Mantras Make Great Role Models
 Our Great War
 Inspiration is Realization
 Party of One
 Never Give Up
 Peace Lies Beyond
 The Memories That Keep
 Save Yourself
 Nowhere to Hide
 Underbreath Regrets

See also
List of bands from Canada

References

External links
 High Five Drive Official website
 High Five Drive on myspace
 CBC Radio 3 Artist Page
 High Five Drive on PureVolume
 FullBlast review on Punktastic

Musical groups established in 2001
Musical groups from Winnipeg
Canadian punk rock groups
Melodic hardcore groups
2001 establishments in Manitoba